Club Deportivo Sondika is a football club from Sondika, Biscay, Basque Country, Spain, founded in 1942. It is most notable for its former women's section, which was founded in 1970 as Maiona de Sondika and later changed its name to Txorrieriko Neskak before becoming CD Sondika's women's team in the 1980s.

CD Sondika played in the top national category between 1994 and 2000. Its best results were a 4th position in the 1995 División de Honor and reaching the league's Final Four (established in 1996) in 1998. In 2000 the section was disbanded and most of its players founded Leioa EFT, a new club which two years later became the women's section of Athletic Bilbao.

CD Sondika still competes in the lower regional male categories, playing at the Basozabal ground. Most recently it was 5th in Bizkaia's División de Honor.

Season to season (women)

Former internationals
  Tamara López
  Maite Muguruza

References

External links
 Official website
List of former Sondika women's team members at Txapeldunak

Women's football clubs in Spain
Association football clubs established in 1942
Football clubs in the Basque Country (autonomous community)
Athletic Club Femenino
1942 establishments in Spain